Filino is a rural locality (a settlement) in Klyazminskoye Rural Settlement, Kovrovsky District, Vladimir Oblast, Russia. The population was 173 as of 2010.

Geography 
Filino is located 20 km east of Kovrov (the district's administrative centre) by road. Misaylovo is the nearest rural locality.

References 

Rural localities in Kovrovsky District